Dan  "Moose" Musielewicz (born November 2, 1981) is an American football coach. He is the head football coach at Olivet College in Olivet, Michigan, a position he has held since the 2017 season.

Playing career
Musielewicz attended Britton-Macon High School where he was a member of the football team which he helped win three straight Tri-County Conference champions from 1997-1999. Musielewicz then enrolled at Hillsdale College where, after a red-shirt season, he was a four year starter at wide receiver.

Statistics

Head coaching record

References

External links
 Olivet Comets bio

1981 births
Living people
Hillsdale Chargers football players
Olivet Comets football coaches
Trine Thunder football coaches
High school football coaches in Michigan